Gilpin's Westmorland Extra Dry Gin is a London Dry Gin distilled in London in small batches using the traditional pot still method with spring water from Cartmel in the English Lake District. Botanicals include juniper, sage, borage, lime (fruit) and bitter orange. Bottled at 47% ABV.

Launched in 2011, Gilpin's Westmorland Extra Dry Gin has won the following international blind-tasting award(s):
 World Drinks Awards 2014 - World's Best Gin
 World Drinks Awards 2014 - Best Traditional Style Gin
 International Wine & Spirit Competition 2012 - Gold Medal
 International Wine & Spirit Competition 2011 - Silver Medal
 The Spirits Business Gin Masters 2011 - Silver Medal
 International Spirits Challenge 2011 - Bronze Medal
 The Hong Kong International Wine & Spirit Competition - Silver Medal
 "Gilpin's" is an EU Community Trade Mark of Westmorland Spirits Limited

References

External links 

Products introduced in 2011
English distilled drinks
Gins
2011 establishments in England
Economy of London
Drink companies based in London
Distilleries in England